Dariusz Banasik (born 16 July 1973 in Łęczyca) is a Polish football manager and former player. He was most recently in charge of Ekstraklasa side Radomiak Radom.

Honours

Manager
Radomiak Radom
I liga: 2020–21
II liga: 2018–19

References 

1973 births
Living people
People from Łęczyca
Polish footballers
Association football forwards
GKS Bełchatów players
Polish football managers
II liga managers
I liga managers
Ekstraklasa managers
Znicz Pruszków managers
MKP Pogoń Siedlce managers
Zagłębie Sosnowiec managers
Radomiak Radom managers